Thoelke is a surname. Notable people with the surname include:

 Bjarne Thoelke (born 1992), German footballer
 Wim Thoelke (1927–1995), German television presenter